Alfred "Aki" Schmidt (5 September 1935 – 11 November 2016) was a German football player and manager.

Schmidt played as attacking midfielder for Borussia Dortmund from 1956 to 1968, winning the German Cup in 1965 and the UEFA Cup Winners' Cup in 1966. In total, he played for Dortmund 276 times, scoring 67 times.

He played for the Germany national football team 25 times between 1957 and 1964 and was a member of the team that finished fourth at the 1958 FIFA World Cup in Sweden.

Schmit was manager of Kickers Offenbach between 1970 and 1971, winning the DFB-Pokal in 1970.

Until his death, he served as the fan correspondent of Borussia Dortmund.

Honours

Club
Borussia Dortmund
 German football championship: 1957, 1963
 DFB-Pokal: 1964–65
 European Cup Winners' Cup: 1965–66

Managerial
Kickers Offenbach
 DFB-Pokal: 1969–70

References

External links
 
 
 

1935 births
2016 deaths
German footballers
Germany international footballers
German football managers
Borussia Dortmund players
Bundesliga players
1958 FIFA World Cup players
Kickers Offenbach managers
Association football midfielders
Footballers from Dortmund
West German footballers
West German football managers
People from the Province of Westphalia